Hoeyang County is a kun, or county, in Kangwŏn province, North Korea.  It was established in a general reorganization of local government in 1952.

Geography
The county's area is primarily mountainous, with the Taebaek and Kwangju ranges both passing through the county. Two basins, the Hoeyang Basin and Changdo Basin, interrupt the rugged terrain. The highest point is Piryubong on Kŭmgangsan.  The chief local stream is the Pukhan River, which flows south and east into South Korea.  The climate is continental, with extremely cold winters.

Administrative divisions
Hoeyang county is divided into 1 ŭp (town) and 23 ri (villages):

Economy
The chief local industry is agriculture, although the terrain does not permit rice to be cultivated; instead, local crops include barley, wheat, oats, millet, maize, soybeans, and potatoes. Cattle are also raised. The maize-based yŏt candy from the district is widely known. Local mines work to extract the deposits of tungsten, barite, molybdenum, graphite, gold, silver, and lead found in the county.

Transportation
Hoeyang is served by roads, and also by the Kŭmgangsan Ch'ŏngnyŏn Line of the Korean State Railway.

See also
Geography of North Korea
Administrative divisions of North Korea
Kangwon (North Korea)

External links

Counties of Kangwon Province (North Korea)

zh:淮陽郡